Annabel Dimmock (born 5 October 1996) is an English professional golfer.

Amateur career
As an amateur, Dimmock won the Helen Holm Scottish Women's Open Championship and the Jones/Doherty Cup. She was a member of the England Golf National Girl's squad and represented Europe in the 2014 Junior Ryder Cup, Great Britain and Ireland in the 2014 Curtis Cup and Great Britain at the 2014 Summer Youth Olympics.

Professional career
Dimmock turned professional in 2016 and finished third at the 2017 Lalla Meryem Cup before holding off French amateur Pauline Roussin-Bouchard to win her first Ladies European Tour title by one shot at the 2019 Jabra Ladies Open (a dual-ranking event on the LET Access Series). With the win, she qualified for the 2019 Evian Championship.

Professional wins (1)

Ladies European Tour (1)

Team appearances
Amateur
Junior Ryder Cup (representing Europe): 2014
Curtis Cup (representing Great Britain and Ireland): 2014

Professional
The Queens (representing Europe): 2017

References

External links

English female golfers
Ladies European Tour golfers
Golfers from London
1996 births
Living people